Gerard John Benson (9 April 1931 – 28 April 2014) was an English Quaker poet, teacher, and author. His mother separated from his father Arthur Benson, and he was raised by a family of Christian fundamentalists for the first ten years of his life, thinking they were his parents. Then his mother Eileen married the Romanian-born émigré composer Francis Chagrin and he went to live with them.

Benson had worked as an intelligence decoder in Britain and as an actor, but his vocation was poetry. Originally from London, Benson settled in Bradford in 1989 with his writer/artist wife, Cathy Russell; the couple lived in Manningham. He was a member of the Barrow Poets. He was named poet laureate of the City of Bradford (2008) and was also active with Poems on the Underground.

Benson died on 28 April 2014, aged 83. Shortly before his death, the 83-year-old had recently returned from the BBC in London where he had made recordings of his poetry for the Poetry Archive.

Publications
 London Poems On The Underground (1996); 
 To Catch an Elephant (2002); 
 Omba Bolomba (2005); 
 Best Poems on the Underground (2009); 
 A Good Time (2013);

References

External links
Notice of death of Gerard Benson, poetrylibrary.org.uk; accessed 5 May 2014.

1931 births
2014 deaths
English Quakers
English male voice actors
Writers from London
Writers from Bradford
English male poets
20th-century English poets
20th-century English male writers